Fe Real, stylized as fe Real, is the fifth studio album by the English reggae vocalist Maxi Priest, released in 1992. It was nominated for a Grammy Award, in the "Best Reggae Album" category. The title character of Terry McMillan's novel How Stella Got Her Groove Back listens to the album while on vacation in Jamaica.

The album peaked at No. 60 on the UK Albums Chart. It peaked at No. 191  on the Billboard 200.

Production
The album was recorded in Jamaica, England, and the United States. Many producers worked on the album, including Sly Dunbar. Junior Giscombe toasted on "Make My Day".

Critical reception

The Philadelphia Inquirer wrote: "Built on a subtle foundation of reggae dance-hall riddems, Priest rides the Caribbean groove and never allows it to become monotonous—rare for the genre." Rolling Stone considered "Hard to Get" "the best of the reggae-tinged tracks." The Atlanta Journal-Constitution praised the "infectious mix of reggae and R&B arrangements."

Singles
Three singles were released from the album. The first single was "Groovin' in the Midnight", which reached number 50 in the UK Singles Chart and number 63 on the US Billboard Hot 100. The second single from the album was "Just Wanna Know", released as a double A-side with the song "Fe Real", which features British singer-songwriter Apache Indian. Despite sharing the same title, "Fe Real" wasn't included on Priest's album of the same name but is included on Apache Indian's debut album, No Reservations. The double A-sided single reached number 33 in the UK Singles Chart. "One More Chance" was the third single released from the album, reaching number 40 in the UK.

Track listing

References

Maxi Priest albums
1992 albums
Charisma Records albums